Jiménez is one of the 38 municipalities of Coahuila, in north-eastern Mexico. The municipal seat lies at Jiménez. The municipality covers an area of 3040.9 km² and is located on the international border between Mexico and the USA, here formed by the Río Bravo del Norte (Rio Grande), adjacent to the U.S. state of Texas.

In 2010, the municipality had a total population of 9,935. Oil was recently discovered in Jiménez, and U.S oil companies are in the process of setting operations on both sides of the border, with the majority of the Mexico operations to be based in Cd. Acuna due to its proximity to Jiménez, and operations on the U.S side will be based in Del Rio, Texas. Companies are already working on infrastructure on the U.S side in Val Verde County. The oil industry is going to create an economical impact on both sides of the border.

Towns and villages

The largest localities (cities, towns, and villages) are:

Adjacent municipalities and counties

 Piedras Negras Municipality - southeast
 Zaragoza Municipality - south and west
 Acuña Municipality - north
 Kinney County, Texas - northeast
 Maverick County, Texas - east

References

Municipalities of Coahuila
Coahuila populated places on the Rio Grande